Rope-a-Dope is an album by the American indie rock band Antietam, released in 1994.

Production
The album was produced by Lyle Hysen and Antietam. Ira Kaplan contributed organ to the album's opening track, "Hands Down". Rope-a-Dope includes a cover of Dead Moon's "Graveyard".

Critical reception

Trouser Press thought that "as borne out by songs like the gently psychedelic 'Pine', [Tara] Key has settled into a wafting lower register that accentuates the spooky qualities of her voice; she’s also found a way to channel some of her manic onstage attack." Entertainment Weekly deemed "Hands Down" "a wonderfully propulsive, guitar- and organ-driven bucket of noise." The Washington Post opined that "Key's piercing guitar lines are the group's trademark, yet the gentle, [Tim] Harris-sung 'Hardly Believe' has the album's most memorable tune." 

Greil Marcus, in Artforum, noted that Key and Harris "can't sing," but wrote that "every time you’re about to give up on this music, Key summons a passage on her instrument that does sing." Guitar Player praised Key's "spectacularly distorted tone that's exuberantly trashy yet retains razor-edged definition."

AllMusic called the album "an unjustly overlooked piece of mid-'90s indie rock," writing that the "high point, and possibly the best thing Antietam ever did, is the 11-minute closer 'Silver Solace', which builds and ebbs with structural grace and contains some of Key's most remarkable singing and soloing."

Track listing

Personnel
Tim Harris - bass, vocals
Tara Key - guitars, vocals
Josh Madell - drums, vocals

References

1994 albums
Homestead Records albums